St. Thomas University (STU) is a private Catholic university in Miami Gardens, Florida. The university offers 61 undergraduate and graduate degree programs, and post-graduate certificate programs on-campus and online. As of 2021, the university enrolled 5,921 students, which included 1,797 undergraduate students, 1,498 graduate students, 780 law students, 62 non-degree students, and 1,784 dual enrollment (high school) students. Over the years, the university's students have represented 45 states across the nation, and more than 70 countries.

The university is accredited by the Southern Association of Colleges and Schools Commission on Colleges (SACSCOC).

History
St. Thomas University's history can be traced back to 1946 Havana, Cuba, where it was founded as the Universidad Católica de Santo Tomás de Villanueva, named after Saint Thomas of Villanova. In 1961, Fidel Castro's militia confiscated the school's land and expelled the faculty and priests. In turn, the Augustinians fled to Miami and opened a new Catholic men's college – Biscayne College. In 1984, with the establishment of the School of Law and other graduate degree programs, the college, by then co-educational, again became St. Thomas University. The university came under the sponsorship of the Archdiocese of Miami in 1988, conferring upon St. Thomas the distinction of being the only Catholic Archdiocesan sponsored university in the state of Florida.

From 1970 until 1993, St. Thomas University was the training camp home of the Miami Dolphins NFL team. It was also the spring training home of the Baltimore Orioles.

The university was located in the Opa-locka North census-designated place, in an unincorporated area, until Miami Gardens incorporated as a city on May 13, 2003.

In 2019, St. Thomas University formally installed David A. Armstrong as the university's tenth president.

Presidents

Academics
STU offers 23 undergraduate majors, 24 graduate majors, 4 doctoral programs, and 1 professional law program through its four colleges and schools:
 Benjamin L. Crump College of Law
 Biscayne College of Social and Human Sciences
 Gus Machado School of Business
 School of Science, Technology and Health

St. Thomas University is a member of the Florida Association of Colleges and Universities, the Independent Colleges & Universities of Florida, the National Association of Independent Colleges and Universities, and the Hispanic Association of Colleges and Universities.

Study Abroad
Study abroad opportunities offer students study abroad experiences in Croatia, India, Israel, Italy, and Spain.

Student demographics

Campus
150-acre campus is located in Miami Gardens, Florida; minutes away from Miami's beaches, Wynwood Art District, the MiMo District, Fort Lauderdale, and Miami Downtown. The University Library also contains the Archbishop John C. Favalora Archive and Museum. The museum opened in 2008 and is open to visitors free of charge during the week and by appointment on Saturdays

Residential life
St. Thomas has four residence halls: Villanova Hall, Cascia Hall, Sullivan Hall, University Inn, and Donnellon Hall (currently under construction).

Athletics

The St. Thomas athletic teams are called the Bobcats. The university is a member of the National Association of Intercollegiate Athletics (NAIA), primarily competing in the Sun Conference (formerly known as the Florida Sun Conference (FSC) until after the 2007–08 school year) since the 1990–91 academic year. The Bobcats previously competed in the Sunshine State Conference (SSC) of the NCAA Division II ranks from 1975–76 to 1986–87.

St. Thomas competes in 28 intercollegiate varsity sports: Men's sports include baseball, basketball, cross country, football, golf, rugby, soccer, swimming & diving (2020), tennis, track & field and wrestling (2020); while women's sports include basketball, beach volleyball, bowling, cross country, flag football (2020), golf, lacrosse, rugby, soccer, softball, swimming & diving (2020), tennis, track & field and volleyball; and co-ed sports include cheerleading, competitive dance and eSports.

Honors
Last year, 12 of its 14 athletic teams received NAIA Scholar Team honors while five of the teams competed in national tournaments. Moreover, athletes annually maintain a 3.0 overall GPA. St. Thomas University prides itself on being "Champions of Character" and has annually been sighted as a Five Star Champions of Character Institution by the NAIA.

Notable alumni

Notable alumni of the university include:

References

External links

 Official website
 Official athletics website

 
1961 establishments in Florida
Educational institutions established in 1961
Miami Gardens, Florida
Roman Catholic Archdiocese of Miami
Catholic universities and colleges in Florida
Universities and colleges in Miami-Dade County, Florida